Křižánky is a municipality in Žďár nad Sázavou District in the Vysočina Region of the Czech Republic. It has about 400 inhabitants. Most of the built-up area with well preserved folk architecture is protected by law as a village monument reservation.

Administrative parts
The municipality is made up of villages of České Křižánky, České Milovy and Moravské Křižánky.

Geography

The municipality lies on both banks of the Svratka River, which forms the border between the historical lands of Bohemia and Moravia. The Kyšperský stream, which flows into the Svratka in the municipality, supplies the relatively large Kyšperský pond.

Křižánky is located in the Žďárské vrchy mountain range within the Upper Svratka Highlands of the Bohemian-Moravian Highlands. The mountain Děvet skal, which is with an elevation of  the second largest peak of the Bohemian-Moravian Highlands, is located in the municipal territory.

History
The first written mention of Křižánky is from 1392.

Sights
The Church of Our Lady of Help was built in 1932–1934.

Notable people
František Cína Jelínek (1882–1961), landscape painter; lived and worked here

References

External links

Villages in Žďár nad Sázavou District